Douglas S. Scherr, M.D. (born January 7, 1967) is an American surgeon and specialist in Urologic Oncology. He is currently the Clinical Director of Urologic Oncology at Weill Cornell Medicine. He also holds an appointment at the Rockefeller University as a Visiting Associate Physician.  Scherr was the first physician at Cornell to perform a robotic prostatectomy as well as a robotic cystectomy.

Background
A native of New York,  Scherr studied at Cornell University and received an undergraduate degree in government. After University, Dr. Scherr spent a year abroad in Shenyang, China, after which he attended medical school at the George Washington University School of Medicine.  Subsequently, he completed a 6-year residency in Urology at the New York-Presbyterian Hospital and a Fellowship in Urologic Oncology at Memorial Sloan Kettering Cancer Center for two years. He is married to Jennifer Scherr and they have three children.

Areas of focus
Scherr specializes in treating urologic malignancies. His focus is on the treatment of prostate cancer, bladder cancer, kidney cancer, testicular cancer, and genitourinary and retroperitoneal sarcomas. He performs robotic assisted removal of bladders with total bladder reconstructions, along with colleague Dr. Shahrokh Shariat.

He sits on several advisory boards in companies involved in urologic technology development.  He has been influential in the ergonomics of robotic technology. He has been active in the development of optical coherence tomography and its application to urologic imaging.

Also active in the Laboratory of Urologic Oncology, Scherr has been instrumental in defining the hormonal regulation of bladder cancer and is currently developing a novel class of compounds that utilize the innate immune system to fight urologic tumors. He is working on the development of a non-invasive means to assess human tissue at the microscopic level. To this end, he has patented and developed the concept of “multiphoton endoscopy” which utilizes high speed laser energy to create high quality microscopic images of human tissue. This breakthrough has vast applications in cystoscopy, colonoscopy and  bronchoscopy.

Board certification
American Board of Urology (February, 2003)

Professional organizations
Diplomate, American Board of Urology
Member, Society of Urologic Oncology
Founding Member, Executive Committee, Young Urologic Oncology Society
Member, Society for Basic Urological Research
Member, American Urological Association
Member, New York Section of AUA, Co-chair of Valentine Essay Meeting
Member, Society of University Urologists
Member, American Medical Association
Lecturer, American Austrian Foundation
Member, Cancer and Leukemia Group B (CALGB), GU Core
Member, American Association for Cancer Research (AACR)

Professional honors/awards
 William Beaumont Medical Research Honor Society First Prize for Best Original Medical Essay, The William Shafirt Award, The George Washington University School of Medicine.  “A crisis of unknown proportion:  An empirical analysis of the American medical malpractice system.” 1994
 First Prize for Clinical Investigation,  Ferdinand C. Valentine Urology Residents Essay Meeting, “BCL-2 and P53 expression in clinically localized prostate cancer as predictive markers for the response to external beam radiotherapy.” 1998
 First Prize for Clinical Investigation, Society of University Urology Residents, Annual Chief Resident Meeting, Marietta, Georgia.  “Anti-androgen therapy for prostate cancer and the prevention of osteoporosis:  The role of DES.” 2000
 Second Prize for Clinical Investigation, Ferdinand C. Valentine Urology Residents Essay Meeting, “Collagen Type I Crosslinked N-Telopeptide as a urinary marker for osteoporosis in prostate cancer:  The role of Diethylstilbesterol (DES).” 2000
 Pfizer, Scholars in Urology Award, Awarded for advancing the scientific and clinical field of urology.  2000
 Ferdinand C. Valentine Fellowship for Research in Urology.  The New York Academy of Medicine.  2001–2002.  Syndecan-1 expression in prostate cancer and the role of p27 in primary prostate epithelial cell transformation.
 T32 Research Training Grant.  Memorial Sloan Kettering Cancer Center.  2000–2002.
 Edwin Beer Research Award.  NY Academy of Medicine.  Effective Tumor Immunotherapy in Transitional Cell Carcinoma of the Bladder.  2005-2007
 Career Development Award.  Kidney Urology Foundation of America.    The role of the Pim-1 Oncoprotein in Prostate Carcinogenesis.  2004-2005
 Best Video Award. Society of Laparoscopic Surgery.  Oncological Outcomes of Robotic Cystectomy. San Francisco, CA  August, 2007.

Publications

References

External links
 PubMed search for Douglas S. Scherr

American urologists
American surgeons
American oncologists
Medical educators
Cancer researchers
Cornell University alumni
Living people
1967 births
George Washington University School of Medicine & Health Sciences alumni
Weill Medical College of Cornell University faculty
American medical academics
American medical researchers